Battle of Shamli or Battle of Thana Bhawan was fought on 10 May 1857 between the forces of Imdadullah Muhajir Makki and the East India Company, in the series of Rebellion of 1857.

On 10 May 1857, local Muslims under the leadership of Imdadullah Muhajir Makki gathered at Thana Bhawan, a small town in Shamli district in current-day Uttar Pradesh, around 120-km from Delhi, to stage a violent protest against Company Raj. The clergy won the day in what came to be known as the Battle of Shamli and established a government mostly in the Shamli district. Muhammad Qasim Nanautavi was the Commander-in-Chief and Rashid Ahmad Gangohi was the Qadi of the State but soon after the killing of Muhammad Zamin situation turned in favour of Company and the Arrest of Bahadur Shah Zafar, one of the  main leaders of Indian War of Independence and Shamli fell to British and Thana Bhawan was largely destroyed by Company Army.

Bibliography

References

1857 in India
Shamli district
Shamli